"Best of Bizzle" is a compilation album by grime MC, Lethal Bizzle. It was released on February 27, 2011 for digital download. The album features artists such as Mr Hudson, Donae'o, Dizzee Rascal, Tawiah, Kate Nash and Mark Ronson - along with Lethal Bizzle's fellow grime artists. The first single off the album, "Pow 2011", was released on February 6, 2011. The album consists of 27 songs.

Background 
Bizzle had revealed that he was working on an album titled Best of Bizzle. In an interview in early 2011, Bizzle said: "I'm working on my fourth album, which should be out in the summer. I'm also doing a Bizzle compilation, which is gonna be out in February, again just like tracks from the whole last ten years, like a little celebration thing for the fans, they can get that. It's called The Best Of Bizzle. So yeah, and I've got this album I'm working on. I'm trying to do a real, kinda like movie album. Like the Pow video - the second record is gonna be a continuation of the video and so forth. So there's gonna be another three singles that I'm gonna be dropping."

Singles 
The first single, Pow 2011, released on February 6, 2011 for digital download and features JME, Wiley, Chipmunk, Face, P Money, Ghetts & Kano. It is a re-make of Bizzle's hit single Pow! (Forward). Bizzle revealed that he plans on releasing three more singles from the album - and the second single's video would continue from Pow 2011's.

Previous singles that have already been released and are on the album are; "Uh Oh", "Fire", "Go Hard", "Mind Your Head", "Mr.", "Bizzle Bizzle", "Police on My Back" and "Go Go Go".

Track listing 
Adapted from Amazon.co.uk.

Charts

Release history

References 

2011 compilation albums
Lethal Bizzle albums